Mark Uglem (born May 11, 1951) is an American politician and former member of the Minnesota House of Representatives. A member of the Republican Party of Minnesota, he represented District 36A in the northwestern Twin Cities metropolitan area.

Education
Uglem attended the University of Minnesota Duluth, graduating with a B.A. in urban studies.

Minnesota House of Representatives
Uglem was first elected to the Minnesota House of Representatives in 2012.

Personal life
Uglem is married to his wife, Pam. They have three children and reside in Champlin, Minnesota, where he served as mayor.

References

External links

Mark Uglem official campaign website

1951 births
Living people
People from Champlin, Minnesota
University of Minnesota Duluth alumni
Mayors of places in Minnesota
Republican Party members of the Minnesota House of Representatives
21st-century American politicians